Hendré Stassen (born ) is a South African rugby union player for  in the Top 14. His regular position is lock.

References

South African rugby union players
Living people
1997 births
People from Boksburg
Rugby union locks
Bulls (rugby union) players
South Africa Under-20 international rugby union players
Rugby union players from Gauteng